There are several rivers named Dos Patos River, Rio dos Patos or Rio de los Patos.

Brazil
 Dos Patos River (Goiás)
 Dos Patos River (Iratim River)
 Dos Patos River (Ivaí River)
 Dos Patos River (Mato Grosso)

Argentina
 Río de los Patos